Iberian naming customs are naming customs found on the Iberian Peninsula. These include:
Portuguese naming customs
Spanish naming customs
Basque names
Catalan names
Galician names

Names by culture